Sir John Craig Eaton (April 28, 1876 – March 30, 1922) was a Canadian businessman and a member of the prominent Eaton family.

Life and career

He was born in Toronto, Ontario, the youngest son of department store magnate Timothy Eaton and his wife, Margaret Wilson Beattie. He married Flora McCrea in 1901, and they had six children: Timothy Craig, John David, Edgar Allison, Gilbert McCrea, Florence Mary, and Evlyn (adopted).

In 1905, weeks after laying the final stone at the new store at the corner of Portage and Donald in Winnipeg, John Craig (aka 'Jack') participated in several automobile races, successfully lowering the 5-mile record driving a Packard. He didn't appear to race again after 1905, but his grandson, George Eaton inherited not only the family business, but also the racing gene. 

Upon the death of his father in 1907, he inherited five million dollars and the T. Eaton Company. He became its president at this time, and the company flourished under his control. He greatly influenced the company and expanded the stores nationally.

He built Ardwold, an enormous residence of 50 rooms in Toronto, beginning in 1909 and finishing in 1911. He also acquired a resort home from his mother in Oakville, Ontario, called the Raymar Estate (the estate has since disappeared).

In 1915, Eaton was made a Knight Bachelor in recognition of his participation in the war effort. He thus became Sir John Craig Eaton, and his wife was known as Lady Eaton.

He was a noted philanthropist. Perhaps his most lavish public contribution was the gift, made together with his mother, of land and funds for a large Methodist church on St Clair Avenue in Toronto. Named Timothy Eaton Memorial Church after his father, it was constructed in 1912–14. He also made many donations to Omemee, Ontario, the home town of his wife Flora. These donations included Coronation Hall (1911), and the manse and organ for Trinity United Church.

He died of pneumonia following influenza in 1922 at the age of 45, and his cousin Robert Young Eaton became president of the company until Sir John's son, John David Eaton, reached an appropriate age to take over. Sir John's grandson, John Craig Eaton II, served as chairman of Eaton's in its later years.

See also
 Eatonia, Saskatchewan (named in his honour)

References

External links 
 John Craig Eaton and Flora McCrea Eaton fonds, Archives of Ontario

John Eaton
1876 births
1922 deaths
Deaths from influenza
Canadian Methodists
Canadian businesspeople in retailing
Canadian Knights Bachelor
Canadian people of Ulster-Scottish descent
Canadian socialites
Businesspeople from Toronto
Upper Canada College alumni
Deaths from pneumonia in Ontario